Relámpago is the Spanish word for lightning.

Relámpago or El Relámpago or Relampago may also refer to:

Fiction
Relampago, a comic book character created by Margarito C. Garza and the title of the comic book that introduced him
Relámpago Vivo, the Spanish-translation and alias of the comic book superhero, Living Lightning

Other uses
El Relampago, a pseudonym of Cuban wrestler Konnan (born 1964)
Los Relámpagos del Norte, a Mexican norteño band
Relampago, Texas, United States